Mitovirus is a genus of positive-strand RNA viruses, in the family Mitoviridae. Fungi serve as natural hosts. There are five species in the genus.

Structure
Mitoviruses have no true virion. They do not have structural proteins or a capsid.

Genome 
Mitoviruses have nonsegmented, linear, positive-sense, single-stranded RNA genomes. The genome has one open reading frame which encodes the RNA-dependent RNA polymerase (RdRp). The genome is associated with the RdRp in the cytoplasm of the fungi host and forms a naked ribonucleoprotein complex.

Life cycle
Viral replication is cytoplasmic. Replication follows the positive-strand RNA virus replication model. Positive-strand RNA virus transcription is the method of transcription. The virus exits the host cell by cell-to-cell movement. Fungi serve as the natural host. Transmission routes are parental and sexual.

Taxonomy
There are five species in the genus:
 Cryphonectria mitovirus 1
 Ophiostoma mitovirus 4
 Ophiostoma mitovirus 5
 Ophiostoma mitovirus 6
 Ophiostoma mitovirus 3a

References

External links
 Viralzone: Mitovirus
 ICTV

Mycoviruses
Virus genera